The Khodz is a river of southwest Russia, a left tributary of the Laba. It flows through the Republic of Adygea. The Khodz river valley is home, during breeding season to the threatened Egyptian vulture.

References

Rivers of Adygea